Family Four were a Swedish pop group who recorded during the 1960s and 1970s. They were made up of Berndt Öst, Marie Bergman, Agnetha Munther and Pierre Isacsson. They won Melodifestivalen twice, in 1971 with "Vita vidder" and in 1972 with "Härliga sommardag". They  went on to represent Sweden in the Eurovision Song Contest on these two occasions. They finished sixth in 1971 and 13th in 1972. They also represented their home country Sweden at the opening ceremony of the 1974 FIFA World Cup. 

Both Marie Bergman and Pierre Isacsson went on to successful solo careers.

Discography 

 1971 (1971)
 Family Four's jul (1971)
 Picknick (1972)
 Family Four på Berns (1973)
 Family Four: Guldkorn (2000)

References 

Swedish musical groups
Melodifestivalen winners
Eurovision Song Contest entrants for Sweden
Eurovision Song Contest entrants of 1971
Eurovision Song Contest entrants of 1972
Melodifestivalen contestants of 1971